Tunbridge Walks is a 1703 comedy play by the English writer Thomas Baker. It starred the droll actor William Pinkethman in a leading role. It is also known by the longer title Tunbridge Walks, or the Yeoman of Kent.

It was part of a growing trend of British plays set in spa towns. The play features the folk song King John and the Bishop. It was revived numerous times during the eighteenth century at Drury Lane, Covent Garden and Haymarket.

The original Drury Lane cast included John Mills as Loveworth, Robert Wilks as Reynard, Benjamin Johnson as Woodcock, William Pinkethman as Squib, William Bullock as Maiden, Jane Rogers as Belinda, Susanna Verbruggen as Hillaria, Mary Powell as Mrs Goodfellow, Henrietta Moore as Penelope and Jane Lucas as Lucy.

References

Bibliography
 Burling, William J. A Checklist of New Plays and Entertainments on the London Stage, 1700-1737. Fairleigh Dickinson Univ Press, 1992.
 Orr, Bridget. British Enlightenment Theatre: Dramatizing Difference. Cambridge University Press, 2020.

1703 plays
West End plays
Comedy plays
Plays set in England
Plays by Thomas Baker